Joseph Cléophas Léger (September 10, 1913 – April 9, 1991) was a Canadian politician. He served in the Legislative Assembly of New Brunswick from 1952 to 1974 as member of the Liberal party.

References

1913 births
1991 deaths